Kuzi ayam or ayam masak kuzi is a traditional food in Kelantan, Malaysia.

The main ingredients used to prepare this cuisine are chicken(Malay:ayam). Kuzi ayam is a unique thick based curry. Traditionally it is best eaten with Ghee rice, Bun and Roti jala. Sometime,  its usually served with dinner roll and Roti Jala.

See also

 Cuisine of Malaysia

References

External links
 Kuzi ayam| iCookAsia

Malay cuisine